Marjan Bolhar, Slovenian athlete and professional firefighte]. * 17. November 1976

Personal life

Early life 
Marjan was born on 17 November 1967 in Ljubljana (Slovenia). His parents' names were Marjan (father) and Helena (mother) Bolhar. He spent most of his childhood in the village of Češenik (Domžale).

Marriage and children 
Marjan is married to Marjana Bolhar which whom he has three children (Kaja, Patrik, and Maj).

Career and volunteering 
Marjan became a firefighter early in his youth when he was serving as a firefighter volunteer in PGD Dob, where he is also currently in service. He later became a professional firefighter, working at "Center za zaščito in reševanje Domžale". He is also helping as a firefighter volunteer at "Industrijsko društvo Helios". Besides being a firefighter, he is also the founder and the main martial arts coach at "Klub borilnih veščin Domžale". He is also coaching as a volunteer at the primary school for children with special needs "Osnovna šola Roje", at the retirement home Domžale and at the health and wellbeing foundation "Šola zdravja Domžale".

Sports career 
Marjan's sports career started already quite early. He achieved his first noticeable results in boxing when he was 15 years old and selected as the best junior Slovenian boxer. After a few years of competing as an amateur boxer, he switched to kickboxing, where he was able to achieve quite a few important results on the international stage. Until 2006, Marjan was coached by a well-known Slovenian boxer and author Janez Gale. Marjan is also the only remaining Janez Gale's athlete who is still active to this day (2022). Marjan participated in more than 300 different matches during his lengthy career.

During the WAKO Oceania Open cup 2018, Marjan met a famous bodybuilder, actor, and politician Arnold Schwarzenegger. Arnold invited him to compete at the 2020 World's Strongest Firefighter event in Santa Monica (California, US).

During his sports career, Marjan had quite a few knee-related injuries. He was able to overcome them and continue with the competitions.

Diplomas, Licences and Ranks 
In his sports career, Marjan achieved the following titles by teaching and training various sports:

 Boxing – licensed coach
 Kickboxing – licensed coach
 Kickboxing – martial arts master, 4th dan
 Aikido – martial arts master, 1st dan

Other recognition 

 2013 – Best male sportsperson – Municipality of Domžale
 2015 – Best male sportsperson – Municipality of Domžale
 Recognition for many years of work and outstanding achievements of the Association of Professional Firefighters of Slovenia
 2013 – WAKO Best Fighter Special Trophy (Antalya, Turkey)
 2014 – Silver plaque of the Slovenian Olympic Committee for outstanding achievements
 2014 – Special recognition of the Municipality of Domžale and the Institute for Sport and Recreation of Domžale
 2014 -Special recognition of the Municipality of Domžale and the Institute for Sport and Recreation of Domžale
 2016 – Silver plaque of the Slovenian Olympic Committee for outstanding achievements
 2021 – Recognition of the Municipality of Domžale for special achievements for 28 years of competitions and 21 years of coaching

Boxing 
More significant Marjan's achievements as an amateur boxer:

 Best Junior Athlete (Slovenia)
 2003 – Slovenian National Champion −75 kg category
 2003 – Slovenian Iron Fist
 2003 – Slovenian Golden Belt
 2004 – Slovenian National Champion – 75 kg category
 2004 – Slovenian Iron Fist
 2004 – Slovenian Golden Belt

Kickboxing 
In a sports career lasting more than a decade, Marjan achieved resounding results on three continents – Europe, North America and Australia. At the same time, he was also a multiple-times Slovenian kickboxing national champion and a member of the Slovenian kickboxing team.

More significant Marjan's achievements as a kickboxer:

 večkratni (15x) državni prvak (Slovenija)
 2006 – WAKO World Cup (Dublin, Ireland), 2nd place
 2011 – Balkan Championship (Belgrade, Serbia), 1st place
 2011 – WAKO World Cup "Best fighter" (Rimini, Italy), 1st place
 2011 – WAKO European Cup (Italy), 1st place
 2013 – WAKO European Cup (Belgrade), 1st place
 2013 – WAKO European Cup (Turin, Italy), 1nd place
 2013 - WAKO World Cup (Antalya, Turkey), 3rd place
 2014 – WAKO American Open Championship (Toronto, Canada), 1st place
 2015 – WAKO American Open Championship (Toronto, Canada), 1st place
 2015 – WAKO World Cup (Dublin, Ireland), 2nd place
 2015 – WAKO World Cup (Belgrade), 3rd place
 2016 – WAKO European Cup (Mareno di Piave, Italy), 2nd place
 2016 – WAKO World Cup (Las Vegas, Nevada, US), 3rd place
 2018 – WAKO European Cup (Makarska, Croatia), 1st place
 2018 – WAKO Oceania Open Championship (Melbourne), 1st place
 2019 – WAKO Oceania Open Championship (Auckland, New Zealand), 1st place

By competing at the WAKO Oceania Open Championship 2019 in Auckland, Marjan also completed his kickboxing career.

Firefighter competitions 

 2020 – Charity event for the California Firefighters (Santa Monica, California), where Marjan competed in the lineup of the 10 best professional firefighters, as the only European. He competed against 8 Americans and 1 Canadian.

References 

Living people
Slovenian male boxers
Slovenian kickboxers
Aikidoka
Firefighters
Year of birth missing (living people)